Biru County is the most populated county within Nagqu of the Tibet Autonomous Region. The name means "female yak". Either of the following pronunciations can be considered correct in Standard Tibetan: [bìru] ~ [pìru] (conventionally written Biru in English) or [ɖìru] ~ [ʈìru] (conventionally Driru).

Geography 
Diru/Driru/ Biru lies in the southwest part of the former province of Kham. To its east is Chamdo and to its west Nagchu. Diru/Driru/Biru is located on the Gyalmo Ngulchu River (upper part of Salween River). Diru is bordered by Sog county སོག་རྫོང་། to the northwest and the extreme east of Palbar (Banbar County) དཔལ་འབར་རྫོང་, is also surrounded by Lhari county ལྷ་རི་རྫོང་/ to the south, and extreme north to the Nagchu county.

Sepu Kangri is located in the county.

Climate

Demographics 
At the 2009 PRC census, the county's population was 60,179, of whom:

Gallery

References

Counties of Tibet
Nagqu